The Mujahid Force  is a paramilitary regiment and a component of the National Guard of Pakistan, normally under the command of the Pakistan Army.

History 
The force was established in 1965, and was merged into the National Guard when that organization was formed in 1972. The Force is further regulated by the National Guards Act, 1973, which became law on 12 August 1973. This law sets out, amongst other things, the criteria for applicants and that the Force personnel were subject to military law with respect to criminal charges. It was raised as a reserve force to support and supplement the regular Army during national emergencies and war. The headquarters are in Bhimber, Azad Kashmir, established in 1992.

The Force was originally intended as a border guard unit but has been involved in military actions in recent years. In August 2012, it was reported it was being trained by the Special Service Group (special forces) as part of cross-border infiltration efforts by the Pakistan Army. In 2018, the force was alleged to have deployed four battalions to the Line of Control in Kashmir, to engage in cross-border infiltration activities against Indian forces. Later in 2018, it was announced that several temporary battalions were to be given permanent status. In November 2019, after the dissolution of the Indian state of Jammu and Kashmir, the Force was reported to have deployed about 17,000 personnel in 25 battalions, closer to the Line of Control.

Training 
Some members of the Force have been trained alongside military personnel at the Pakistan Military Academy in Kakul, with the 12th such intake graduating in March 2022.

Insignia 
The Force badge depicts a star held up by two pointed ends of a crescent super imposed with a dagger in vertical position in clasped wrist pointing upward, resting on a scroll with a war cry inscribed in Arabic.

Public image 
The Force regularly participates in public events. For example, the 760th Battalion was involved in the Pakistan Day military parade in Islamabad on 23 March 2017.

The Mujahid Force was involved in controversy in June 2019 when it advertised jobs for cleaners but specified that only Christians should apply, although the advertisement was soon withdrawn.

Engagements 
 Indo-Pakistani War of 1965
 Indo-Pakistani War of 1971
 Fire exchange along the Line of Control since 1991

Units
Known battalions

 641 Battalion
 642 Battalion
 645 Battalion
 646 Battalion
 647 Battalion
 648 Battalion
 649 Battalion
 651 Battalion

 654 Battalion
 655 Battalion
 658 Battalion
 702 Battalion
 760 Battalion
 792 Battalion
 801 Battalion

See also 
 Azad Kashmir Regiment
 Janbaz Force

References 

Military units and formations established in 1965
Military in Azad Kashmir
National Guard (Pakistan)
Regiments of Pakistan